A Dekabrist ("Decembrist") was a participant in the Russian Decembrist revolt of 1825.

It can also refer to:
 Soviet ship Dekabrist, several vessels of the former Soviet Union
 Dekabrist (flower), the common Russian term for a Christmas cactus

See also
 Dekabristy, a 1927 Russian film
 Dekabristov Island, a riverine island in St Petersburg
 Decembrist (disambiguation)